6 (six) is the natural number following 5 and preceding 7. It is a composite number and the smallest perfect number.

In mathematics

Since 6 equals the sum of its proper divisors, it is a perfect number; 6 is the smallest of the perfect numbers. It is also the smallest Granville number, or -perfect number.

As a perfect number:
6 is related to the Mersenne prime 3, since . (The next perfect number is 28.)
6 is the only even perfect number that is not the sum of successive odd cubes.
6 is the root of the 6-aliquot tree, and is itself the aliquot sum of only one other number; the square number, .

Six is the only number that is both the sum and the product of three consecutive positive numbers.

Unrelated to 6's being a perfect number, a Golomb ruler of length 6 is a "perfect ruler". Six is a congruent number.

Six is the first discrete biprime (2 × 3) and the first member of the (2 × q) discrete biprime family.

Six is a unitary perfect number, a primary pseudoperfect number, a harmonic divisor number and a superior highly composite number, the last to also be a primorial.

There are no Graeco-Latin squares with order 6. If n is a natural number that is not 2 or 6, then there is a Graeco-Latin square with order n.

There is not a prime  such that the multiplicative order of 2 modulo  is 6, that is, 
By Zsigmondy's theorem, if  is a natural number that is not 1 or 6, then there is a prime  such that . See  for such .

The ring of integer of the sixth cyclotomic field  , which is called Eisenstein integer, has 6 units: ±1, ±ω, ±ω2, where .

The smallest non-abelian group is the symmetric group S3 which has 3! = 6 elements.

S6, with 720 = 6! elements, is the only finite symmetric group which has an outer automorphism. This automorphism allows us to construct a number of exceptional mathematical objects such as the S(5,6,12) Steiner system, the projective plane of order 4 and the Hoffman-Singleton graph. A closely related result is the following theorem: 6 is the only natural number n for which there is a construction of n isomorphic objects on an n-set A, invariant under all permutations of A, but not naturally in one-to-one correspondence with the elements of A. This can also be expressed category theoretically: consider the category whose objects are the n element sets and whose arrows are the bijections between the sets.

In the classification of finite simple groups, twenty of twenty-six sporadic groups in the happy family are part of three families of groups which divide the order of the friendly giant, the largest sporadic group: five first generation Mathieu groups, seven second generation subquotients of the Leech lattice, and eight third generation subgroups of the friendly giant. The remaining six sporadic groups do not divide the order of the friendly giant, which are termed the pariahs (Ly, O'N, Ru, J4, J3, and J1).

Six similar coins can be arranged around a central coin of the same radius so that each coin makes contact with the central one (and touches both its neighbors without a gap), but seven cannot be so arranged. This makes 6 the answer to the two-dimensional kissing number problem. The densest sphere packing of the plane is obtained by extending this pattern to the hexagonal lattice in which each circle touches just six others.

6 is the largest of the four all-Harshad numbers.

A six-sided polygon is a hexagon, one of the three regular polygons capable of tiling the plane. Figurate numbers representing hexagons (including six) are called hexagonal numbers. Because 6 is the product of a power of 2 (namely 21) with nothing but distinct Fermat primes (specifically 3), a regular hexagon is a constructible polygon.

Only six polygons are faces of non-prismatic uniform polyhedra such as the Platonic solids or the Archimedean solids: the triangle, the square, the pentagon, the hexagon, the octagon, and the decagon. 

Six is also an octahedral number. It is a triangular number and so is its square.

There are six basic trigonometric functions.

There are six convex regular polytopes in four dimensions.

The six exponentials theorem guarantees (given the right conditions on the exponents) the transcendence of at least one of a set of exponentials.

All primes above 3 are of the form 6n ± 1 for n ≥ 1.

6 is a pronic number and the only semiprime to be.

There are six different ways in which 100 can be expressed as the sum of two prime numbers -- 3 + 97, 11 + 89, 17 + 83, 29 + 71, 41 + 59 and 47 + 53.

List of basic calculations

{|class="wikitable" style="text-align: center; background: white"
|-
! style="width:105px;"|Division
!1
!2
!3
!4
!5
!6
!7
!8
!9
!10
! style="width:5px;"|
!11
!12
!13
!14
!15
|-
|6 ÷ x
|6
|3
|2
|1.5
|1.2
|1
|0.
|0.75
|0.
|0.6
!
|0.
|0.5
|0.
|0.
|0.4
|-
|x ÷ 6|0.1
|0.
|0.5
|0.
|0.8
|1
|1.1
|1.
|1.5
|1.
!
|1.8
|2
|2.1
|2.
|2.5
|}

{|class="wikitable" style="text-align: center; background: white"
|-
! style="width:105px;"|Exponentiation
!1
!2
!3
!4
!5
!6
!7
!8
!9
!10
! style="width:5px;"|
!11
!12
!13
|-
|6|6|36
|216
|1296
|7776
|46656
|279936
|1679616
|10077696
|60466176
!
|362797056
|2176782336
|13060694016
|-
|x|1
|64
|729
|4096
|15625
|46656
|117649
|262144
|531441
|1000000
!
|1771561
|2985984
|4826809
|}

Greek and Latin word parts is classical Greek for "six". Thus:
"Hexadecimal" combines  with the Latinate  to name a number base of 16
A hexagon is a regular polygon with six sides
 is a French nickname for the continental part of Metropolitan France for its resemblance to a regular hexagon
A hexahedron is a polyhedron with six faces, with a cube being a special case
Hexameter is a poetic form consisting of six feet per line
A "hex nut" is a nut with six sides, and a hex bolt has a six-sided head
The prefix "" also occurs in the systematic name of many chemical compounds, such as hexane which has 6 carbon atoms.

The prefix sex-

Sex- is a Latin prefix meaning "six". Thus:
Senary is the ordinal adjective meaning "sixth"
People with sexdactyly have six fingers on each hand
The measuring instrument called a sextant got its name because its shape forms one-sixth of a whole circle
A group of six musicians is called a sextet
Six babies delivered in one birth are sextuplets
Sexy prime pairs – Prime pairs differing by six are sexy, because sex is the Latin word for six.

The SI prefix for 10006 is exa- (E), and for its reciprocal atto- (a).

Evolution of the Arabic digit

The evolution of our modern digit 6 appears rather simple when compared with the other digits. The modern 6 can be traced back to the Brahmi numerals of India, which are first known from the Edicts of Ashoka circa 250 BCE. It was written in one stroke like a cursive lowercase e rotated 90 degrees clockwise. Gradually, the upper part of the stroke (above the central squiggle) became more curved, while the lower part of the stroke (below the central squiggle) became straighter. The Arabs dropped the part of the stroke below the squiggle. From there, the European evolution to our modern 6 was very straightforward, aside from a flirtation with a glyph that looked more like an uppercase G.

On the seven-segment displays of calculators and watches, 6 is usually written with six segments. Some historical calculator models use just five segments for the 6, by omitting the top horizontal bar. This glyph variant has not caught on; for calculators that can display results in hexadecimal, a 6 that looks like a "b" is not practical.

This digit resembles an inverted 9. To disambiguate the two on objects and documents that can be inverted, the 6 has often been underlined, both in handwriting and on printed labels.

In music

In artists
 Bands with the number six in their name include Six Organs of Admittance, 6 O'Clock Saints, Electric Six, Eve 6, Los Xey ( is Basque for "six"), Out On Blue Six, Six In Six, Sixpence None the Richer, Slant 6, Vanity 6, and You Me At Six
 #6 is the pseudonym of American musician Shawn Crahan, when performing with the band Slipknot

In instruments
A standard guitar has six strings
Most woodwind instruments have six basic holes or keys (e.g., bassoon, clarinet, pennywhistle, saxophone); these holes or keys are usually not given numbers or letters in the fingering charts

In music theory
There are six whole tones in an octave.
There are six semitones in a tritone.

In works
"Six geese a-laying" were given as a present on the sixth day in the popular Christmas carol, "The Twelve Days of Christmas."
Divided in six arias, Hexachordum Apollinis is generally regarded as one of the pinnacles of Johann Pachelbel's oeuvre.
The theme of the sixth album by Dream Theater, Six Degrees of Inner Turbulence, was the number six: the album has six songs, and the sixth song — that is, the complete second disc — explores the stories of six individuals suffering from various mental illnesses.
Aristotle gave six elements of tragedy, the first of which is Mythos.

In religion

In Judaism:
Six points on a Star of David
Six orders of the Mishnah
Six symbolic foods placed on the Passover Seder Plate
God took six days to create the world in the Old Testament Book of Genesis; humankind was created on day 6. In the City of God, Augustine of Hippo suggested (book 11, chapter 30) that God's creation of the world took six days because 6 is a perfect number.
The Jewish holiday of Shavuot starts on the sixth day of the Hebrew month of Sivan
Seraphs have six wings.
In Islam:
There are Six articles of belief
Fasting six days of Shawwal, together with the month of Ramadan, is equivalent to fasting the whole year
In Hindu theology, a trasarenu is the combination of six celestial  (atoms).
In Taoism:
Six Lines of a Hexagram
Six Ministries of Huang Di

In science

Astronomy
Messier object M6, a magnitude 4.5 open cluster in the constellation Scorpius, also known as the Butterfly Cluster
The New General Catalogue object NGC 6, a spiral galaxy in the constellation Andromeda
The Roman numeral VI:
Stands for subdwarfs in the Yerkes spectral classification scheme
(Usually) stands for the sixth-discovered satellite of a planet or minor planet (e.g. Jupiter VI)
6 Hebe

Biology

The cells of a beehive are six-sided.
Insects have six legs.
Six kingdoms in the taxonomic rank below domain (biology); Animalia, Plantae, Fungi, Protista, Archaea/Archaeabacteria, and Bacteria/Eubacteria. See Kingdom (biology).
The six elements most common in biomolecules are called the CHNOPS elements; the letters stand for the chemical abbreviations of carbon, hydrogen, nitrogen, oxygen, phosphorus, and sulfur. See CHON.

Chemistry

A benzene molecule has a ring of six carbon atoms.
6 is the atomic number of carbon.
The sixfold symmetry of snowflakes arises from the hexagonal crystal structure of ordinary ice.
A hexamer is an oligomer made of six subunits.

Medicine
There are six tastes in traditional Indian medicine (Ayurveda): sweet, sour, salty, bitter, pungent, and astringent. These tastes are used to suggest a diet based on the symptoms of the body.
Phase 6 is one of six pandemic influenza phases.

Physics

In the Standard Model of particle physics, there are six types of quarks and six types of leptons.
In statistical mechanics, the six-vertex model has six possible configurations of arrows at each vertex
There are six colors in the RGB color wheel: (primary) red, blue, green, (secondary) cyan, magenta, and yellow. (See Tertiary color)
In three-dimensional Euclidean space, there are six unknown support reactions for a statically determinate structure: one force in each of the three dimensions, and one moment through each of three possible orthogonal planes.

In sports
 The Original Six teams in the National Hockey League are Toronto, Chicago, Montreal, New York, Boston, and Detroit. They are the oldest remaining teams in the league, though not necessarily the first six; they comprised the entire league from 1942 to 1967.
 Number of players:
 In association football (soccer), the number of substitutes combined by both teams, that are allowed in the game.
 In box lacrosse, the number of players per team, including the goaltender, that are on the floor at any one time, excluding penalty situations.
 In ice hockey, the number of players per team, including the goaltender, that are on the ice at any one time during regulation play, excluding penalty situations. (Some leagues reduce the number of players on the ice during overtime.)
 In volleyball:
 Six players from each team on each side play against each other.
 Standard rules only allow six total substitutions per team per set. (Substitutions involving the libero, a defensive specialist who can only play in the back row, are not counted against this limit.)
 Six-man football is a variant of American or Canadian football, played by smaller schools with insufficient enrollment to field the traditional 11-man (American) or 12-man (Canadian) squad.
 Scoring:
 In both American and Canadian football, 6 points are awarded for a touchdown.
 In Australian rules football, 6 points are awarded for a goal, scored when a kicked ball passes between the defending team's two inner goalposts without having been touched by another player.
 In cricket, six runs are scored for the batting team when the ball is hit to the boundary or the ground beyond it without having touched the ground in the field.
 In basketball, the ball used for women's full-court competitions is designated "size 6".
 In rugby union, the starting blindside flanker wears jersey number 6. (Some teams use "left" and "right" flankers instead of "openside" and "blindside", with 6 being worn by the starting left flanker.)

In technology

On most phones, the 6 key is associated with the letters M, N, and O, but on the BlackBerry Pearl it is the key for J and K, and on the BlackBerry 8700 series and Curve 8900 with full keyboard, it is the key for F
The "6-meter band" in amateur radio includes the frequencies from 50 to 54 MHz
6 is the resin identification code used in recycling to identify polystyrene

In calendars
In the ancient Roman calendar, Sextilis was the sixth month. After the Julian reform, June became the sixth month and Sextilis was renamed August
Sextidi was the sixth day of the décade in the French Revolutionary calendar

In the arts and entertainment

Games
The number of sides on a cube, hence the highest number on a standard die
The six-sided tiles on a hex grid are used in many tabletop and board games.
The highest number on one end of a standard domino

Comics and cartoons
The Super 6, a 1966 animated cartoon series featuring six different super-powered heroes.

Literature
The Power of Six is a book written by Pittacus Lore, and the second in the Lorien Legacies series.
Number 6 is a character in the book series Lorien Legacies

TV
 Number Six (Tricia Helfer), is a family of fictional characters from the reimagined science fiction television series, Battlestar Galactica
Number 6, the main protagonist in The Prisoner played by Patrick McGoohan, and portrayed by Jim Caviezel in the remake.
Six is a character in the television series Blossom played by Jenna von Oÿ.
Six is the nickname of Kal Varrik, a central character in the television series Dark Matter, played by Roger Cross.
Six is a History channel series that chronicles the operations and daily lives of SEAL Team Six.
Six Feet Under, an HBO series that ran from 2005 to 2011.

Movies
Number 6 (Teresa Palmer) is a character in the movie I Am Number Four (2011).
The 6th Day (2000), starring Arnold Schwarzenegger.
The Sixth Sense (1999), written and directed by M. Night Shyamalan and starring Haley Joel Osment and Bruce Willis.
Girl 6 (1996), directed by Spike Lee.

Musicals
 Six is a modern retelling of the lives of the six wives of Henry VIII presented as a pop concert.

Anthropology
The name of the smallest group of Cub Scouts and Guiding's equivalent Brownies, traditionally consisting of six people and is led by a "sixer".
A coffin is traditionally buried six feet under the ground; thus, the phrase "six feet under" means that a person (or thing, or concept) is dead
There are said to be no more than six degrees of separation between any two people on Earth.
In Western astrology, Virgo is the 6th astrological sign of the Zodiac
The Six Dynasties form part of Chinese history
Six is a lucky number in Chinese culture.
The Birmingham Six were a British miscarriage of justice, held in prison for 16 years.
"Six" is used as an informal slang term for the British Secret Intelligence Service, MI6.

In other fields

Six pack is a common form of packaging for six bottles or cans of drink (especially beer), and by extension, other assemblages of six items.
In Pythagorean numerology (a pseudoscience), the number 6 is the digit of balance, harmony and organization of the home and family
The fundamental flight instruments lumped together on a cockpit display are often called the Basic Six or six-pack.
The number of dots in a braille cell.
See also Six degrees (disambiguation).
Extrasensory perception is sometimes called the "sixth sense".
Six Flags is an American company running amusement parks and theme parks in the U.S., Canada, and Mexico.
In the U.S. Army "Six" as part of a radio call sign is used by the commanding officer of a unit, while subordinate platoon leaders usually go by "One". (For a similar example see also: Rainbow Six.)

See also 
List of highways numbered 6

References

The Odd Number 6, JA Todd, Math. Proc. Camb. Phil. Soc. 41 (1945) 66–68
A Property of the Number Six, Chapter 6, P Cameron, JH v. Lint, Designs, Graphs, Codes and their Links 
Wells, D. The Penguin Dictionary of Curious and Interesting Numbers London: Penguin Group. (1987): 67 - 69

External links

The Number 6
The Positive Integer 6
Prime curiosities: 6

Integers
6 (number)